Tehri Garhwal is a district in the hill state of Uttarakhand, India. Its administrative headquarters is at New Tehri. The district has a population of 618, 931 (2011 census), a 2.35% increase over the previous decade. It is surrounded by Rudraprayag District in the east, Dehradun District in the west, Uttarkashi District in the north, and Pauri Garhwal District in the south. Tehri Garhwal is a part of the Himalayas.

Etymology
The name Tehri has been derived from Trihari, signifying a place that washes away the three types of sins – sins born out of Mansa, Vacha and Karmana or thought, word and deed, respectively. Garh in Hindi means fort.

History

Early
Prior to 888 CE, the region was divided into 52  which were ruled by independent kings. These  were brought into one province by Kanakpal, a prince of Malwa. Kanakpal, on his visit to Badrinath, had met the then mightiest king Bhanu Pratap who later married his only daughter to the prince and handed over his kingdom to him.

Gorkha Rule
In 1803, the Gorkhas invaded Garhwal commanded by army generals Amar Singh Thapa, Hastidal Shah Chautariya, Bamshah Chautariya and Ranjor Thapa against King Pradyumna Shah and his sons Kunwar Parakrama Shah and Kunwar Pritam Shah. The Garhwal and Gorkha armies fought at Khurbura and the Garhwal king was killed. The Gorkhas occupied Dehradun, Saharanpur and Shimla and later extended their kingdom up to Kangra.

From 1787 to 1812, the Gorkhas invaded and occupied nearly 200 villages which were under the control of the East India Company. The British argued with the king but to no avail. The Gurkha War began in 1814, when an army of 8,000 under Major General Marley attacked Kathmandu. Four thousand soldiers under Major General Wood started an operation from Gorakhpur and 3,500 soldiers attempted to take over Dehradun under Major General Zileswy. The British army captured Dehradun on 30 November 1814 and moved towards Kumaon. The Gorkha commanders Hastidal Shah and Jayrakha were killed at Vinayathal. The war ended with the Sugauli Treaty, signed on 2 December 1815 and ratified on 4 March 1816 by Gorkha supreme commander Bamshah and thus, British rule started in the hills. The East India Company then merged Kumaon, Dehradun and east Garhwal into the British Empire while west Garhwal was given back to Sudarshan Shah, then becoming known as Tehri Riyasat.

Garhwal Kingdom

Tehri Garhwal or the Garhwal Kingdom, was a princely state, ruled by the Rajput Parmar (Shah) dynasty. Later, it became a part of the Punjab Hill States Agency of British India, which consists of the present day Tehri Garhwal District and most of the Uttarkashi district. The ruler was given the title of raja, but after 1913, he was honoured with the title of Maharaja. The ruler was entitled to salutes of 11 guns and had a privy purse of rupees 300,000.

King Sudarshan Shah established his capital at Tehri town and afterwards his successors Pratap Shah, Kirti Shah and Narendra Shah established their capital at Pratap Nagar, Kirtinagar and Narendra Nagar, respectively. Their dynasty ruled over this region from 1815 to 1949. During the Quit India Movement people of this region actively worked for the independence of the country. Ultimately, when the country was declared independent in 1947, the inhabitants of Tehri Riyasat (Tehri State) started their movement to free themselves from the clutches of the maharaja.

Due to this movement, the situation became out of his control and it was difficult for him to rule over the region. Consequently, the 60th king of Panwar Vansh, Manabendra Shah, accepted the sovereignty of the Indian government. Thus, in August 1949, Tehri Riyasat was merged into Uttar Pradesh and was given the status of a new district, the Tehri Garhwal district. Subsequently, on 24 February 1960, the state government separated its one tehsil which was given the status of a separate district named Uttarkashi. The former royal palace of the Maharaja of Tehri Garhwal at Narendra Nagar, now houses the Ananda In the Himalayas spa, established 2000.

Modern developments
In the 1960s, Tehri Garhwal extended much farther east than it currently does. In 1997, much of the eastern portion of Tehri Garhwal was detached and merged with portions of the Pauri Garhwal district and the Chamoli district to form the Rudraprayag district.

Tehri Lake    With a surface area of 52 km2, a man-made lake in New Tehri, is the largest lake in Uttarakhand. It has good options for Adventure Sports and various water sports like Boating, Banana Boat, Bandwagon Boat, Jet Ski, Water Skiing, Para-sailing, Kayaking.

Economy
Tehri Garhwal economy revolves around Public sector undertakings, Agriculture and Tourism.

Crops
Dry season crops include wheat, barley, masoor, Bengal and red gram, rapeseed and mustard, and pea. Wet season crops include rice, barnyard millet, finger millet, black gram, sesame and soybean. Various fruits and spices grow in the district also.

Assembly Constituencies
Ghanshali (SC)
Devprayag
Narendranagar
Pratapnagar
Tehri
Dhanulti

Administrative setup
The district of Tehri Garhwal is divided into two subdivisions: Kirti Nagar and Tehri-Pratap Nagar. It has seven tehsils, one sub-tehsil, nine blocks, two municipalities and four town area committees. The district covers 76 Nagar Panchayats and 928 gram panchayats. It has 1,847 revenue villages and 2,508 clusters.

Demographics

According to the 2011 census Tehri Garhwal district has a population of 618,931, roughly equal to the nation of Solomon Islands or the US state of Vermont. This gives it a ranking of 520th in India (out of a total of 688). Its population growth rate over the decade 2001–2011 was 1.93%. Tehri Garhwal has a sex ratio of 1078 females for every 1000 males, and a literacy rate of 75.1%. Scheduled Castes and Scheduled Tribes make up 16.50% and 0.14% of the population respectively.

Hindus number 596,769; Muslims 6,390 (1.05%); and Sikhs 561.

The major first language of the district is Garhwali, accounting for 90.5% of the population according to the 2011 census. Hindi is widely used as a lingua franca, but is the first language of only 6% of the people. Other languages spoken include Jaunsari (0.98%) and Nepali (0.95%).

Notable people
Anand Sharan Raturi, educator
Sunderlal Bahuguna, environmentalist
Sridev suman freedom fighter, social activist

See also 

 Panwar Dynasty
 Garhwal Kingdom

References

External links

 
Complete Uttarakhand Information
Complete Garhwal Information
 , an engraving of a painting by David Cox for Fisher's Drawing Room Scrap Book, 1832 with a poetical illustration by Letitia Elizabeth Landon.

 
Districts of Uttarakhand
Uttarakhand
Garhwal division